Widening participation (WP) in higher education is a major component of government education policy in the United Kingdom and Europe. It consists of an attempt to increase not only the numbers of young people entering higher education, but also the proportion from under-represented groups (those from lower income families, people with disabilities and some ethnic minorities).

In this way it is hoped to redress the inequalities in participation between social classes. Widening participation is one of the strategic objectives of the Office for Students (OfS).  The issue of widening participation became a political issue after the Laura Spence Affair which hit the headlines in 2000, and after the University of Bristol admissions controversy in 2003, which concerned alleged biases against and in favour of state schools, respectively.

The Office for Students is pursuing this policy through a number of measures, including the payment of financial incentives to universities and by funding the Uni Connect programme.

This policy is linked to the previous Labour government's target of increasing participation in higher education to 50% by 2010.

See also
 Academic inflation
 Affirmative action
 Office for Students

References

Further reading
Young participation in higher education by Mark Corver HEFCE 2005/03
Review of widening participation research: addressing the barriers to participation in higher education, Report to HEFCE by University of York, Higher Education Academy and Institute for Access Studies, July 2006 
How to think about widening participation in UK higher education, Report to HEFCE by Professor Sir David Watson, July 2006 
Review of widening participation research: addressing the barriers to participation in higher education, Report to HEFCE by University of York, Higher Education Academy and Institute for Access Studies, September 2006

External links
Role of the Office for Students (OfS) in promoting equal opportunities in higher education
Widening participation in higher education in England, Report by the Comptroller and Auditor General, HC485 Session 2001–2002: 18 January 2002
DfES White Paper: The future of Higher Education, 2003
HEFCE: Widening participation
DfES Higher Education
The Uni Connect programme, an OfS-funded programme to widen participation
AccessHE: Organisation supporting the progression of under-represented groups in London to Higher Education
National co-ordination team for widening participation in higher education
Pure Potential: Independent, national organisation which helps bright students from state schools and colleges with university and careers
Into University: an education charity working to promote widening participation.

Higher education in the United Kingdom
Educational stages
Universities and colleges in the United Kingdom
University and college admissions